Youngson is a surname. Notable people with the surname include:

Allan Youngson (born 1984), professional footballer
George Youngson (1919–1982), Scottish cricketer
Robert Youngson (1917–1974), American film producer, director, and screenwriter